Cadole is a village in Flintshire, Wales. It lies west of Gwernymynydd and Mold (Yr Wyddgrug), south of Gwernaffield and to the east of the Clwydian Range, part of an Area of Outstanding Natural Beauty.

The name appears as Cat-hole, Cat Hole and Cathole on eighteenth century maps, and the village was still known by this name in living memory. The Place-Names of Flintshire states that the name was deliberately changed to its modern spelling following the gentrification of the area, so that the name could be derived from the Welsh place name elements 'Cae' (field) and 'Dôl' (meadow). One reason often given for this deliberate change was that English incomers found the name Cat-hole (or its English homographs) to be unseemly.

References

External links 

Photos of Cadole and surrounding area on geograph.org.uk

Villages in Flintshire